Smilax blumei  is a vine in the greenbrier family. It is native to parts of Southeast Asia (Thailand, Andaman Islands, Peninsular Malaysia, Java) as well as to New Guinea and northern Australia (Queensland and Northern Territory).

References

Smilacaceae
Monocots of Australia
Flora of the Andaman Islands
Flora of Thailand
Flora of Malaya
Flora of Java
Flora of Queensland
Flora of Papuasia
Plants described in 1827